False Accusations is the third studio album by The Robert Cray Band and was released 1985.

In the same year, Cray won the W.C. Handy Award for best male artist of 1985.

Track listing
"Porch Light" (Dennis Walker) – 5:01
"Change of Heart, Change of Mind (S.O.F.T)" (Cray, Richard Cousins) – 3:49
"She's Gone" (David Amy, Cray, Ozall Washington, Peter Boe) – 2:50
"Playin' in the Dirt" (David Amy, Cray) – 3:46
"I've Slipped Her Mind" (Dennis Walker) – 5:15
"False Accusations" (Dennis Walker, Cray, Richard Cousins) – 3:55
"The Last Time (I Get Burned Like This)" (Cray) – 3:50
"Payin' for It Now" (David Amy, Cray) – 4:38
"Sonny" (David Amy, Dennis Walker) – 4:48

Personnel
The Robert Cray Band
Robert Cray - guitar, vocals
Richard Cousins - bass
Peter Boe - keyboards
David Olson - drums
Horn section
David Li - horn arrangement, tenor saxophone, percussion on "Porch Light"
Nolan Smith - trumpet
Additional musicians
Dave Wilson - second guitar on "Sonny" 
Dennis Walker - second bass on "Sonny"

Certifications

References

1985 albums
Robert Cray albums
HighTone Records albums